Champion System–Stan's NoTubes is a UCI Continental cycling team based in New York City. It was founded in 2014.

Team roster

References

 www.csnotubes.com

Cycling teams based in the United States
UCI Continental Teams (America)
Sports teams in New York City
Cycling teams established in 2014
2014 establishments in New York (state)